Skyscraper is the second full-length studio album by David Lee Roth, released during his solo career after his departure as the original lead vocalist from Van Halen. It was released on January 26, 1988, on Warner Bros. Records.

Overview
Skyscraper was issued shortly after the commercially and critically successful Eat 'Em and Smile Tour of 1986–1987. Skyscraper hit No. 6 on the Billboard Top 200 U.S. album chart during February 1988, en route to selling two million copies in the United States. The album features one of Roth's most popular singles, "Just Like Paradise", which reached No. 6 on the U.S. Billboard Hot 100 chart. Additionally, it features the acoustic ballad "Damn Good", which reached No. 2 on the U.S. Billboard Rock chart.

At the time of its release, the eclectic, quasi-psychedelic Skyscraper divided public and critical opinion. Although Roth's 1988 Skyscraper Tour was successful, many fans and critics disappointed by Van Halen's post-Roth, keyboard-heavy sound expressed similar dissatisfaction with Skyscraper. Guitarist Steve Vai (who co-produced Skyscraper, and co-wrote many of its songs) and bassist Billy Sheehan, who formed the core of David Lee Roth's solo band, left the group over various controversies regarding Skyscraper.

Cash Box called the single "Stand Up" an "engaging, catchy rock song, with a funky danceable groove."  Cash Box called "Damn Good" a "satisfying and artistic effort."

Track listing
All songs written by David Lee Roth and Steve Vai unless otherwise noted.

"Knucklebones" (Gregg Bissonette, Matt Bissonette, Roth) – 3:18
"Just Like Paradise" (Roth, Brett Tuggle) – 4:03
"The Bottom Line" – 3:38
"Skyscraper" – 3:40
"Damn Good" – 5:49
"Hot Dog and a Shake" – 3:19
"Stand Up" (Roth, Tuggle) – 4:39
"Hina" – 4:41
"Perfect Timing" (Roth, Tuggle) – 3:41
"Two Fools a Minute" – 4:29
Covers of "California Girls" and "Just a Gigolo/I Ain't Got Nobody", from Roth's 1985 Crazy from the Heat EP, open some editions released in Europe.

Notes
Roth's management received a phone call asking for permission for "Just Like Paradise" to be used as the theme song of a new television show, Beverly Hills 90210. They rejected the idea without asking Roth first, so an original piece of instrumental music was used instead.
A brief sample from the title track intro was used several times as incidental music in the Miami Vice episode "Missing Hours", broadcast in November 1987.
In a 2022 interview with eonmusic, Vai said that "Damn Good" was developed from a piece called "Scandinavian Air Solo", which was originally slated to appear on his Passion and Warfare album.
"Hina" features only one guitar track; it is panned hard to one side, while a delay effect then sends the guitar effects to the other ear, sounding as if Vai is playing along with himself.

Personnel

 David Lee Roth – vocals

The band
Steve Vai – guitar, horn (alto)
Billy Sheehan – bass guitar, backing vocals
Gregg Bissonette – drums, percussion, backing vocals
Brett Tuggle – keyboards, programming, backing vocals

Guest musicians
Gary Falcone – backing vocals on tracks 1 and 9
Joe Pizzulo – backing vocals on track 1
Tommy Funderburk, Tom Kelly – backing vocals on track 2
John Batdorf – backing vocals on track 9
Magic Moreno – backing vocals on track 10
Dr. Funk, PhD – bass synthesizer
Todd Grace, Richie Raposa – programming, keyboard programming

Production
David Lee Roth – producer, concept, cover design
Steve Vai – co-producer, engineer
Magic Moreno – engineer, mixing
Gary Wagner – engineer
Doug Parry – engineer
Paul Levy – engineer
Steve Holroyd – engineer
Marnie Riley – engineer
Stephen Shelton – engineer
Bob Cats – mixing
Bernie Grundman – mastering
Pete Angelus – concept, cover design
Galen Rowell – photography
Vigon Seireeni – artwork
Gina Vivona – artwork
Eddie Anderson – personal assistant

Charts

Weekly charts

Certifications

References

1988 albums
David Lee Roth albums
Warner Records albums
Albums recorded at Capitol Studios
Glam metal albums